The Rapa Nui calendar was the indigenous lunisolar calendar of Easter Island. It is now obsolete.

Attestation
William J. Thomson, paymaster on the USS Mohican, spent twelve days on Easter Island from December 19 to 30, 1886. Among the data Thomson collected were the names of the nights of the lunar month and of the months of the year:

The natives reckoned their time, and in fact do so still by moons or months, commencing the year with August, which was, according to the traditions,the time when Hotu-Matua and his followers landed upon the island.

Months
Thomson recorded the months as follows:

{| class="wikitable"
!Rapanui name !! Meaning !! Western equivalent, 1886–1887
|-
|Anekena 	
|
|August
|-
| Hora-iti 
| little summer
| September
|-
| Hora-nui 
| big summer	
| October
|-
| Tangarouri 	
| 
| part of November
|- 
| Kotuti 	
|
| November and December
|-
| Ruti 	
|
| December and January
|-
| Koro 	
|
| January
|-
| Tuaharo 	
|
| February
|-
| Tetuupu
|
| March
|-
| Tarahao 
|
| April
|-
| Vaitu-nui 
| big winter
| May
|- 
| Vaitu-poto 
| short winter
| June
|-
| Maro or Temaro
|
| July
|}

Days

The month was divided in two, beginning with the new and full moon. Thomson recorded the calendar at the time of his visit to the island as follows. The new moon occurred on November 25 and again on the night of December 24; Thompson records the crescent was first visible on November 26. 

{| class="wikitable"
!Rapanui name !! Meaning !! Western  equivalent, 1886
|-
| Kokore tahi 
| first kokore
| November 27
|-
| Kokore rua 
| second kokore
| November 28
|-
| Kokore toru 
| third kokore 
| November 29
|-
| Kokore hâ 
| fourth kokore 
| November 30
|-
| Kokore rima 
| fifth kokore 
| December 1
|-
| Kokore ono 
| sixth kokore 
| December 2
|-
| Maharu 
| first quarter 
| December 3
|-
| Ohua
| 
| December 4
|-
| Otua
| 
| December 5
|-
| Ohotu
| 
| December 6
|-
| Maure
| 
| December 7
|-
| Ina-ira
| 
| December 8
|-
| Rakau
|
| December 9
|- 
! Omotohi 
! full moon
! December 10
|-
| Kokore tahi 
| first kokore 	
| December 11
|-
| Kokore rua 
| second kokore
| December 12
|-
| Kokore toru 
| third kokore 	
| December 13
|-
| Kokore hâ 
| fourth kokore
| December 14
|-
| Kokore rima 
| fifth kokore 	
| December 15
|-
| Tapume
|
| December 16
|-
| Matua
|
| December 17
|-
| Orongo
| first quarter 
| December 18
|-
| Orongo taane
|
| December 19
|-
| Mauri nui
|
| December 20
|-
| Marui  kero
|
| December 21
|-
| Omutu
|
| December 22
|-
| Tueo
|
| December 23
|-
! Oata 
! new moon
! December 24
|-
| Oari 
| 
| December 25
|-
| Kokore tahi 
| first kokore
| December 26
|}

The three sources we have correspond with each other except for two intercalary days (in bold), and the night of the new moon in Englert, which seems to have been confused with one of these. Beginning with (o)ata, the night of the new moon, they are: 

*New moon, full moon, and first and last quarters.

The kokore are unnamed (though numbered) nights; tahi, rua, toru, haa, rima, ono are the numerals 1–6. The word  is cognate with Hawaiian ‘a‘ole "no" and Maori kahore "no" and Tahitian ‘aore "there is/are not"; here it may mean "without [a name], nameless".

Analysis
The calendar collected by Thomson is notable in that it contains thirteen months. All other authors mention only twelve, and Métraux and Barthel find fault with Thomson:

Thomson translates Anakena as August and suggests that the year began at that time because Hotu-Matua landed at Anakena in that month, but my informants and Roussel (1869) give Anakena as July.

We are basing the substitution on the lists by Metraux and Englert (ME:51; HM:310), which are in agreement. Thomson's list is off by one month.

However, Guy calculated the dates of the new moon for years 1885 to 1887 and showed that Thomson's list fit the phases of the moon for 1886. He concluded that the ancient Rapanui used a lunisolar calendar with kotuti its embolismic month (AKA "leap month"), and that Thomson chanced to land on Easter Island in a year with a leap month.

The days hotu and hiro appear to be intercalary. A 28-day calendar month needs one to two intercalary days to keep in phase with the 29½-day lunar month. One of the rongorongo tablets may describe a rule for when to add these days.

References

Easter Island
Specific calendars
Rongorongo